The 1990–91 OHL season was the 11th season of the Ontario Hockey League. Sixteen teams each played 66 games. The Sault Ste. Marie Greyhounds won the J. Ross Robertson Cup, defeating the Oshawa Generals. The Detroit Compuware Ambassadors are granted a franchise.

Expansion/Realignment

Detroit Compuware Ambassadors

On December 11, 1989, the Detroit Compuware Ambassadors were approved to join the league for the 1990–91 season as an expansion team. The club was owned by former Windsor Compuware Spitfires owner Peter Karmanos. The club was the first American based team in the OHL, and would play in the city of Detroit. The Compuware Ambassadors home was Cobo Arena, which was previously the home of the Detroit Pistons of the NBA from 1960 to 1978, and the Michigan Stags, who played in the World Hockey Association during the 1974-75 season.

The new club would join the Emms Division.

Realignment
As the expansion Detroit Compuware Ambassadors joined the Emms Division, the league also moved the Hamilton Dukes to the Emms Division. The Sudbury Wolves and North Bay Centennials would realign to the Leyden Division, as each division would have eight teams.

Regular season

Final standings
Note: GP = Games played; W = Wins; L = Losses; T = Ties; GF = Goals for; GA = Goals against; PTS = Points; x = clinched playoff berth; y = clinched division title

Leyden Division

Emms Division

Scoring leaders

Playoffs

Division quarter-finals

Leyden Division

(1) Oshawa Generals vs. (6) Sudbury Wolves

(2) North Bay Centennials vs. (5) Peterborough Petes

(3) Belleville Bulls vs. (4) Ottawa 67's

Emms Division

(1) Sault Ste. Marie Greyhounds vs. (6) Hamilton Dukes

(2) Niagara Falls Thunder vs. (5) Kitchener Rangers

(3) London Knights vs. (4) Windsor Spitfires

Division semi-finals

Leyden Division

(2) North Bay Centennials vs. (4) Ottawa 67's

Emms Division

(2) Niagara Falls Thunder vs. (4) Windsor Spitfires

Division finals

Leyden Division

(1) Oshawa Generals vs. (4) Ottawa 67's

Emms Division

(1) Sault Ste. Marie Greyhounds vs. (2) Niagara Falls Thunder

J. Ross Robertson Cup

(L1) Oshawa Generals vs. (E1) Sault Ste. Marie Greyhounds

Awards

1991 OHL Priority Selection
The Detroit Compuware Ambassadors held the first overall pick in the 1991 Ontario Priority Selection and selected Todd Harvey from the Cambridge Winterhawks. Harvey was awarded the Jack Ferguson Award, awarded to the top pick in the draft.

Below are the players who were selected in the first round of the 1991 Ontario Hockey League Priority Selection.

See also
List of OHA Junior A standings
List of OHL seasons
1990–91 WHL season
1990–91 QMJHL season
1991 Memorial Cup
1991 NHL Entry Draft
1990 in sports
1991 in sports

References

HockeyDB

Ontario Hockey League seasons
OHL